Shelter is the fourth studio album by French shoegaze band Alcest. It was released on 17 January 2014 via Prophecy Productions. The album's name is related to the album's overall concept of shelter, "a safe place to escape, this secret thing we all have when life is going too fast and you are full of anxiety." The album marks a significant stylistic shift for the band, fully embracing the band's shoegaze and dream pop influences while eliminating the previous metal influences, with Rolling Stone writing that the album has "more in common genetically with Sigur Rós than Satyricon."

Musical style, recording and writing 
The album's style sees the band delving deeper into their shoegaze influences and "leaving metal behind" entirely. Rolling Stone compared the album to "If the Cocteau Twins discovered a long-lost triplet who had slugged it out in space-pop groups and post-rock bands", comparing the style to Slowdive, Mogwai, and Sigur Rós. According to AllMusic's Thom Jurek, "It is deeply indebted to its '90s British inspirational sources and wholly invested in the melodic sensibilities this group has displayed from the very beginning." Other critics have highlighted the post-rock influence on the album, comparing the closing track 'Délivrance' to This Will Destroy You, God Is an Astronaut, and similar bands.

The concept of the album is encapsulated in the album's title: Shelter. In an interview with Spin, Neige explained that "It's just a safe place to escape, this secret thing we all have when life is going too fast and you are full of anxiety", adding that "This shelter could be anything – a person, a movie, music. It's something that reminds you in a way of who you are, like a mirror, and convinces you to get lost."  In a separate interview, he explained that "We all have things that are helping us. I wouldn't say that I’m a depressive person because I’m not, but I can have darker moments, and it really helps me. ‘Shelter’ is about that." Neige found his shelter in the sea, saying "I love to spend time by the sea, just having very simple moments disconnected from the stress of everyday life and sitting on the beach and watching the waves."

Neige has discussed their choice to work with Birgir Jón Birgisson and record the album in Iceland, explaining that previous recording studios specialized in metal, whereas the band were interested in pursuing a different sound on this album. "We wanted to change our habits, and to take a bit more risks. On the previous record, we had this very clean, metal sound, very regular." He cited the studio's experience in recording with Sigur Rós as a factor in their decision. Neige also explained that "Iceland fit well with this concept of Shelter. It is a place that is isolated from everything, and it feels like being in a creative bubble all the time."

Touring and promotion 
The band premiered the first single "Opale" on 29 November 2013 with a music video.

In support of the album, the band toured across Europe in early 2014, as well as the United States and Mexico from September–October 2015 with Emma Ruth Rundle.

Critical reception 

Shelter was met with positive reviews from music critics upon its initial release. At Metacritic (a review aggregator site which assigns a normalized rating out of 100 from music critics), based on 13 critics, the album has received a score of 76, which indicates "generally positive reviews".

While many critics praised the dreamy atmosphere, guitar textures, and overall beauty of the album's style, the stylistic move away from the band's earlier blackgaze sound was a common point of contention. Exclaim! critic Dean Brown wrote a very positive review of the album, "Neige's ever-growing confidence as a songwriter has undoubtedly influenced his songwriting decisions for Shelter. And to call this album a "progression" for Alcest may be a bit of a leap—and so too would be calling Shelter a "brave" album. Shelter is less of a progression and more of a magnification of the beauteous, gentile side of Alcest and a complete suppression of the blackness at the heart of the band." In contrast, Pitchfork contributor Jason Heller argued in his review of the album that "Still capable of great feats of mood and beauty, Alcest have transformed themselves, although not always in the best way. They’ve gone from being a remarkably innovative, influential, and singular force in a subgenre they helped create to being just another shoegaze act. That doesn't make Shelter a bad album. As an aural analgesic, it goes down smooth and numbs what it needs to. But instead of tearing open the passageway between this world and whatever lies beyond, it shrinks that portal to the size of a keyhole." By contrast, writer Thom Jurek from AllMusic felt that there wasn't enough progress with their new direction in sound: "If there is criticism for Shelter, it's that it sounds as if Alcest are inching rather than stepping forward and stasis has a hold on them; but with the band's catalog as argument, that's deliberate. Musical movement aside, it's a lovely sounding record. Even in its self-conscious worship of shoegaze it could easily become a late addition to that genre's canon. Shelter is well-crafted, vulnerable, and honest."

Track listing

Personnel
Adapted from liner notes.
Alcest
 Neige – vocals, guitar, bass, keyboards, percussion, glockenspiel
 Winterhalter – drums, percussion

Additional musicians
amiina – strings
Hildur Ársælsdóttir – violin
Edda Rún Ólafsdóttir – viola
Maria Huld Markan Sigfúsdóttir – violin
Sólrún Sumarliðadóttir – cello
Neil Halstead  – vocals
Billie Lindahl – choir, vocals

Other personnel
Birgir Jón Birgisson – arrangement, engineering, mixing, production
Elisabeth Carlsson – assistant
Andy Julia – picture
William Lacalmontie – band photo
Joe LaPorta – mastering
Metastazis – layout
MK – production
Antoine Nouel – assistant
Valnoir – layout

Charts

References

External links

2014 albums
Alcest albums
Dream pop albums by French artists
Post-rock albums by French artists